Miaenia variabilis is a species of beetle in the family Cerambycidae. It was described by Per Olof Christopher Aurivillius in 1927.

References

Miaenia
Beetles described in 1927